Domination or dominant may refer to:

Society
 World domination, which is mainly a conspiracy theory
 Colonialism in which one group (usually a nation) invades another region for material gain or to eliminate competition
 Chauvinism in which a person or group consider themselves to be superior, and thus entitled to use force to dominate others
 Sexual dominance involving individuals in a subset of BDSM behaviour
 Hierarchy
 Patriarchy

Music
 Dominant (music), a diatonic scale step and diatonic function in tonal music theory
 Dominant seventh chord, a four-note chord consisting of a major triad and a minor seventh
 Domination (Cannonball Adderley album), 1965
 Domination (Domino album), 2004
 Domination (Morbid Angel album), 1995
 Domination (Morifade album), 2004
 "Domination", a song by Band-Maid from World Domination
 "Domination", a song by Pantera from Cowboys from Hell
 "Domination", a song by Symphony X from Paradise Lost
 "Domination", a song by Way Out West from Way Out West
 "Domination", a song by Within the Ruins from Black Heart

Games
 Domination (chess), where a chess piece with wide movement cannot avoid capture
 Domination (video game), a turn-based computer game
 Domination (poker), a way of rating a poker hand
 Domination, also known as Focus, a 1964 game designed by Sid Sackson
 Domination (role-playing game), a tabletop role-playing game
 DomiNations, a 2015 mobile strategy game

Science
 Dominant wind, winds that blow predominantly from a single general direction over a particular point on the Earth's surface
 Dominance (linguistics), a relationship between syntactic nodes

Biology
 Dominance (genetics), one allele is expressed over a second allele at the same locus
 Footedness, the natural preference of one's left or right foot
 Handedness, a better performance or preference for use of a hand 
 Ocular dominance, the tendency to prefer visual input from one eye to the other
 Dominance (ecology), the degree to which a taxon is more numerous than its competitors in an ecological community

Mathematics
 Dominating decision rule, in decision theory
 Domination number, in graph theory
 Dominant maps, in rational mapping
 Dominated convergence theorem, application of function domination in measure theory

Other uses
 Domination (angel), in Christian angelology
 Dominant CZ, a Czech Czech company
 The Domination, a dystopian alternate history series by S. M. Stirling
 Dominance and submission, in an erotic episode or lifestyle

See also
 Britney: Domination, a 2019 Las Vegas residency concert by Britney Spears
 Dominance (disambiguation)
 Dominator (disambiguation)
 Male dominance (disambiguation)